Maryam Salum Msabaha (born 12 May 1971) is a Tanzanian CHADEMA politician and Member of Parliament representative for women special seats from 2015 to 2020.

References

1971 births
Living people
Chadema MPs
Chadema politicians
Zanzibari politicians
Tanzanian MPs 2015–2020
21st-century Tanzanian women politicians
Open University of Tanzania alumni